Matthias Nawrat (born 1979 in Opole) is a German writer.

Life 
Matthias Nawrat was born in Opole in Poland. He moved with his family in 1989 to Bamberg. From 2000 to 2007, he studied Biology at Heidelberg and Freiburg im Breisgau. Beginning in 2009 he studied at the Swiss Literature Institute in Biel/Bienne. 
His debut novel, Wir zwei allein was published in 2012 by Nagel & Kimche. He lives in Berlin.

Works

Novels 
 Wir zwei allein. Nagel & Kimche, Zürich 2012. .
 Unternehmer. Rowohlt Verlag, Hamburg 2014. .
 Die vielen Tode unseres Opas Jurek. Rowohlt Verlag, Reinbek 2015. .

Awards 
 MDR-Literaturpreis 2011
 Silberschweinpreis der  2012
 Aufenthaltsstipendium am Literarischen Colloquium Berlin (LCB) 2012
 Literaturpreis des Kantons Bern 2012
 Kelag-Preis beim Ingeborg-Bachmann-Preis 2012
 Heinrich-Heine-Stipendium Lüneburg 2013
 Förderpreis des Adelbert-von-Chamisso-Preis 2013
 2014 Longlist beim Deutschen Buchpreis mit Unternehmer

References

External links 

 
 
 Homepage von Matthias Nawrat

1979 births
21st-century German novelists
Writers from Berlin
Living people
People from Opole